Angel Manfredy (born October 30, 1974) is a Puerto Rican-American former professional boxer. Angel Manfredy was a popular fighter in the late 1990s.

Personal 
Manfredy, nicknamed El Diablo (The Devil) because of his reckless lifestyle and of his boxing style converted to Christianity after trying to commit suicide in his bed while on cocaine.

He wears a tattoo of the Puerto Rican Flag on his shoulder. Also he has a tattoo of the cross and a naked lady.

Amateur career 

Manfredy had an amateur record of 48–8.

Professional career 
Manfredy was known for his walk-ins to his matches wearing a latex mask depicting Satan, which he used until his fight with Floyd Mayweather and conversion to Apostolic Pentecostalism.

During his career, Manfredy defeated notable fighters, such as Arturo Gatti (by technical knockout), Ivan Robinson (by knockout), Jorge Páez, and Julio Díaz (by a split decision). He also fought  notables Floyd Mayweather Jr., Paul Spadafora and Diego Corrales. A frequent contender, Manfredy was a former WBU Super Featherweight champion, but lost in each of four attempts to capture a World Title. Manfredy currently has a record of 43-8-1 (32 knockouts).

Manfredy lost two of his first five fights, but then won 23 in a row, including wins over former champions such as Calvin Grove, and Jorge Páez, and top contenders such as Wilson Rodriguez, before landing his first major fight against Gatti, in the latter's hometown of Atlantic City. Manfredy, who was an underdog, dominated the fight, knocking Gatti down in the third round, and eventually stopping him on cuts in round 8.

Following this fight, Manfredy fought twice before fighting Floyd Mayweather Jr. in a major HBO television event. Manfredy was stopped in the second round after a barrage of punches. Manfredy called the stoppage premature and stated he was not injured. This was one of Manfredy's first fights in his new Christian personality, and celebrated having Kid Rock appear at the match singing for him during his walk-in.

Following this fight, Manfredy knocked out Ivan Robinson in what had been HBO's Boxing After Dark's highest-rated show of 1999. Manfredy then received another world title shot against Stevie Johnston in 1999, but was thoroughly outboxed. In 2002 Manfredy challenged Paul Spadafora for the International Boxing FederationWorld lightweight title. Spadafora beat Manfredy in a close decision. Manfredy last fought in 2004.

Training and Promoting 
In 2017 Manfredy took a position as a trainer and promoter in Crown Point, Indiana in a gym owned by boxer Ricky Carr.

See also 

 List of Puerto Rican boxing world champions

Professional boxing record

References

External links 
 
Official Website

1974 births
Living people
Sportspeople from Gary, Indiana
American boxers of Latin American descent
 Boxers from Indiana
Puerto Rican boxers
Converts to Christianity
Lightweight boxers